Erardi is an old Maltese surname. Notable people with the surname include:
Alessio Erardi (1669–1727), Maltese painter
Greg Erardi (born 1954), American baseball player
Pietro Erardi (1644–1727), Maltese painter
Stefano Erardi (1630–1716), Maltese painter

Maltese-language surnames